Aimal Kansi (born 10 February or 22 October 1964 – 14 November 2002) was a Pakistani national who was convicted of the 1993 shootings at CIA Headquarters in Langley, Virginia. In the incident, Kansi killed two CIA employees and wounded three others. He soon fled to Kandahar, Afghanistan, which later became a Taliban stronghold, and went into hiding for four years. While in Pakistan, he was caught and arrested by the FBI with help from Pakistani police forces. After being returned to the U.S., he was convicted of capital murder and sentenced to death. He was executed by lethal injection in 2002.

Background
Kansi was an ethnic Pashtun born on either 10 February 1964 or 22 October 1964 or 1 January 1967 in Quetta, Pakistan. He entered the United States in 1991 under the name Mir Aimal Kansi and brought a substantial sum of cash which he had inherited in 1989 upon the death of his father. He traveled on forged papers that he had purchased in Karachi, Pakistan. He had altered his name to "Kansi" and later bought a fake US green card in Miami, Florida.

He stayed with a Kashmiri friend, Zahid Mir, in his Reston, Virginia apartment, and he worked for a courier service. That work would be decisive in his choice of target: "I used to pass this area almost every day and knew these two left-turning lanes [were] mostly people who work for CIA." According to Kansi, he first began to think of attacking CIA personnel after he bought a Chinese-made AK-47 from a Chantilly, Virginia gun store. The plan soon became "more important than any other thing to [him]."

Shootings 

On 25 January 1993, Kansi stopped his borrowed brown Datsun station wagon behind a number of vehicles waiting at a red traffic light on the eastbound side of Route 123, Fairfax County. The vehicles were waiting to make a left turn into the main entrance of CIA headquarters. Kansi emerged from his vehicle with his semi-automatic Type 56 assault rifle and proceeded to move among the lines of vehicles, firing a total of 10 rounds into them, killing Lansing H. Bennett, 66, and Frank Darling, 28. Three others were left with gunshot wounds. Darling was shot first and later received additional gunshot wounds to the head after Kansi shot the other victims.

Kansi returned to his vehicle and drove to a nearby park. After 90 minutes of waiting, he realized that he was not being actively sought; he then drove back to his Reston apartment. At the time, reports said police were looking for a white male in his twenties and that the shooting was not thought to be directly connected to the CIA. He hid the rifle in a green plastic bag under a sofa, went to a McDonald's to eat, and booked himself into a Days Inn for the night. The CNN news reports he watched made it clear that police had misidentified his vehicle and did not have his license plate number. The next morning, he took a flight to Quetta, Pakistan.
According to Kansi, he killed CIA employees because, "I was really angry with the policy of the U.S. government in the Middle East, particularly toward the Palestinian people," Kansi said in a prison interview with CNN affiliate WTTG.

On 16 February 1993, Kansi, then a fugitive, had been charged in absentia. The charges involved the capital murder of Darling, the murder of Bennett, and three counts of malicious wounding for the other victims, along with related firearms charges.

Arrest and rendition 
In May 1997, an informant walked into the U.S. consulate in Karachi and claimed he could help lead them to Kansi. As proof, he showed a copy of a driver's license application made by Kansi under a false name but bearing his photograph. Apparently, the people who had been sheltering Kansi wanted the multimillion-dollar reward offer for his capture. Kansi stated, "I want to make it clear [that] the people who tricked me [...] were Pushtuns, they were owners of land in the Leghari and Khosa clan areas in Dera Ghazi Khan, but I will never name them."

As Kansi was in the dangerous Durand Line border region, the informant was told to lure Kansi into Pakistan, where he could be more easily apprehended. Kansi was tempted with a lucrative business offer, smuggling Russian electronic goods into Pakistan, which brought him to Dera Ghazi Khan, in the Punjab province of Pakistan, where he checked into a room at the Shalimar Hotel. At 4 a.m. on 15 June 1997, an armed team of FBI officers, working with the Pakistani Inter-Services Intelligence, raided Kansi's hotel room. His fingerprints were taken on the scene, confirming his identity. Sources disagree as to where Kansi was taken next. US authorities claim it was a holding facility run by Pakistani authorities, but Pakistani sources claim it was the US embassy in Islamabad, before he was flown to the U.S. on 17 June in a C-141 transport. During the flight, Kansi made full oral and written confessions to the FBI.

Trial 
During Kansi's trial, the defense introduced testimony from Dr. Richard Restak, a neurologist and neuropsychiatrist, that Kansi was missing tissue from his frontal lobes, a congenital defect that made it hard for him to judge the consequence of his actions. That testimony was reiterated by another psychiatrist for the defense, based upon independent examination.

Kansi was tried in front of a jury at the Fairfax County Courthouse in Fairfax, Virginia over a period of ten days in November 1997; he had pleaded not guilty to all charges. The jury found him guilty and recommended the death penalty for the capital murder charge. On 4 February 1998, Kansi was sentenced to death for the capital murder of Darling, who was shot at the beginning of the attack and again after the other victims had been shot. His other sentences of life imprisonment for the first-degree murder of Bennett, a 60-year sentence for the three malicious woundings, and fines totaling $600,000 were rendered moot by his execution.

Execution and burial
Kansi was executed by lethal injection on 14 November 2002, at Greensville Correctional Center, near Jarratt, Virginia. Kansi's body was repatriated to Pakistan; his funeral was attended by the entire civil hierarchy of Balochistan, the local Pakistan Army Corps Commander and the Pakistani Ambassador to the United States, Ashraf Jahangir Qazi.

See also 
 Capital punishment in the United States
 Capital punishment in Virginia
 List of people executed in Virginia
 List of people executed in the United States in 2002

References

1964 births
2002 deaths
20th-century criminals
21st-century executions by Virginia
Central Intelligence Agency
FBI Ten Most Wanted Fugitives
Pakistani people convicted of murder
Pakistani people executed abroad
People convicted of murder by Virginia
People executed by Virginia by lethal injection
People executed for murder
People from Quetta
University of Balochistan alumni
Pakistani expatriates in the United States